The 2019–20 Ascenso MX season was a two-part competition: Apertura 2019 and Clausura 2020, which were the final two seasons of Ascenso MX, the second-tier football league of Mexico. Apertura began on 1 August 2019. On April 17, Liga MX President Enrique Bonilla announced the termination of the remainder of the Clausura 2020 tournament. Two reasons were the COVID-19 pandemic and the league's lack of financial resources.

On 22 May 2020 the Clausura season was cancelled and no champion will be crowned. With this announcement there would be no promotion or regulation for six seasons.

Changes from the previous season
All teams are able to be promoted to Liga MX 2020–2021 season.

The relegated team of the Clausura 2020 Liga MX season will remain in Liga MX if it pays MXN$120 million to remain the 20th team of the league. MXN$60 million will go to the Ascenso MX team that would naturally be promoted and MXN$60 million would go to new projects determined by the Liga MX assembly. If the arrangement is declined, the 19 teams of Liga MX are responsible for MXN$120 million, the right to be the 20th team of Liga MX will be acceded to the Liga MX assembly. The vacant position in Liga MX could then be occupied by a certified Ascenso MX team or an external sport project. If the position remains open, Liga MX reserves all rights to do as it sees appropriate for the 2020–21 Liga MX season.

The first ranked team will qualify for semi-finals and teams ranked second through sixth will qualify for the quarter-finals.

Away victories will be counted as four points. The maximum number of points obtainable via this method will be restricted to the first six away matches played by one team.

14 clubs will participate in this season:
 Tiburones Rojos de Veracruz were relegated from Liga MX, then paid the required MXN$120 million to remain in Liga MX.
 Atlético San Luis won the Apertura 2018 and Clausura 2019 season and were automatically promoted to Liga MX.
 Tampico Madero were relegated to the Liga Premier de México, then paid the required fee to remain in Ascenso MX.
 Loros UdeC won the Serie A de México season and were promoted to Ascenso MX.
 Cafetaleros de Tapachula were relocated to Tuxtla Gutiérrez and will play in Ascenso MX as Cafetaleros de Chiapas.
 Grupo Tecamachalco was granted the hiatus of the Alebrijes de Oaxaca franchise for one season and the owners of the previously frozen Zacatepec Siglo XXI reinstated their club as Alebrijes de Oaxaca.
 FC Juárez bought the Lobos BUAP franchise and will play in Liga MX.
 Lobos BUAP received the FC Juárez franchise, but was placed in hiatus until the board presents a viable project for its administration.

Clausura 2020
 On 7 December 2019, Potros UAEM announced they would no longer be able to compete in Ascenso MX citing their financial inability to operate in the division.

 On 27 December 2019, Loros UdeC was dissolved after the death of its owner, because the new board had no interest in maintaining the franchise.

Stadiums and Locations

Personnel and kits

1. On the back of shirt.
2. On the sleeves.
3. On the shorts.
4. On the socks.

Managerial changes

Apertura 2019
The Apertura 2019 season is the 49th season of Ascenso MX. The regular season began on 1 August 2019 and end on 6 December 2019.

Regular season

Standings

Positions by Round

Results
Each team plays once all other teams in 13 rounds regardless of it being a home or away match.

Regular Season statistics

Top goalscorers 
Players sorted first by goals scored, then by last name.

Source:Ascenso MX

Hat-tricks 

(H) – Home ; (A) – Away

Attendance

Per team

Highest and lowest

Source: Ascenso MX

Liguilla (Playoffs)

The seven best teams play two games against each other on a home-and-away basis. The best team will be classified directly to semi-finals. The higher seeded teams play on their home field during the second leg. The winner of each match up is determined by aggregate score. In the quarterfinals and semifinals, if the two teams are tied on aggregate the higher seeded team advances. In the final, if the two teams are tied after both legs, the match goes to extra time and, if necessary, a penalty shoot-out.

Quarter-finals
The first legs were played on 13 and 14 November, and the second legs were played on 16 and 17 November 2019.

|}

All times are UTC−6 except for matches in Cancún.

First leg

Second leg

Semi-finals
The first legs will be played on 20 November, and the second legs will be played on 23 November 2019.

|}

All times are UTC−6 except for matches in Cancún.

First leg

Second leg

Final

|}

First leg

Second leg

Clausura 2020
The Clausura 2020 season is the 50th season of Ascenso MX. The season began on 23 January 2020. On 14 April 2020, it was announced that the Clausura 2020 season would not finish and a champion won't be crowned.

Regular season

Standings

Positions by Round

Results
Each team plays once all other teams in 11 rounds regardless of it being a home or away match.

Regular Season statistics

Top goalscorers 
Players sorted first by goals scored, then by last name.

Source:Ascenso MX

Hat-tricks 

(H) – Home ; (A) – Away

Attendance

Per team

Highest and lowest

Source: Ascenso MX

Relegation table
The relegated team will be the one with the lowest ratio of points to matches played in the following tournaments: Apertura 2017, Clausura 2018, Apertura 2018, Clausura 2019, Apertura 2019, and Clausura 2020. On 2019–20 season the relegation was suspended after dissolution of UAEM and U. de C., the relegation will be resumed in the 2020–21 season.

Last update:15 March 2020
 Rules for relegation: 1) Relegation coefficient; 2) Goal difference; 3) Number of goals scored; 4) Head-to-head results between tied teams; 5) Number of goals scored away; 6) Fair Play points
 R = Relegated
Source: Ascenso MX

Aggregate table
The Aggregate table is the general ranking for the 2019–20 season. This table is a sum of the Apertura and Clausura tournament standings. The aggregate table is used to determine seeding for the "Promotion" Final and for 2020–21 Copa MX qualification.

See also 
2019–20 Liga MX season
2019–20 Liga MX Femenil season
2019–20 Liga Premier de México season

References

External links
 Official website of Ascenso MX

Ascenso MX seasons
1
Ascenso MX